The painted apple moth (Teia anartoides or Orgyia anartoides) is an invasive species that was eradicated from New Zealand.

The moth is a native to Australia but in May 1999 it was found in Glendene, Auckland. A controversial spray programme was carried out to eradicate the moth.

See also
Pesticides in New Zealand

References

External links
Painted Apple Moth at Biosecurity New Zealand
Painted Apple Moth at Museum of New Zealand Te Papa Tongarewa

Invasive animal species in New Zealand